Butler is the county seat of Taylor County, Georgia, United States. Its population was 1,972 at the 2010 census.

Geography
Butler is located at  (32.557, -84.239).

The city is located along U.S. Route 19, which is the main route through the city. U.S. 19 leads north 28 mi (45 km) to Thomaston and south 24 mi (39 km) to Ellaville. The Fall Line Freeway (GA-540) runs from west to east through the southern part of the city, concurrent with Georgia State Route 96. GA-540 and GA-96 lead east 9 mi (14 km) to Reynolds and west 14 mi (23 km) to Junction City. Georgia State Route 137 also runs through the city, leading northeast 20 mi (32 km) to Roberta and southwest 25 mi (40 km) to Buena Vista.

Demographics

2020 census

As of the 2020 United States census, there were 1,881 people, 762 households, and 447 families residing in the city.

2009
As of the census of 2009, there were 1,775 people, 722 households, and 488 families residing in the city. The racial makeup of the city was 50.03% White, 48.93% African American, 0.10% Native American, 0.05% Asian, 0.52% from other races, and 0.37% from two or more races. Hispanic or Latino people of any race were 1.15% of the population.

There were 722 households, out of which 33.0% had children under the age of 18 living with them, 35.5% were married couples living together, 27.3% had a female householder with no husband present, and 32.4% were non-families. 30.2% of all households were made up of individuals, and 13.9% had someone living alone who was 65 years of age or older. The average household size was 2.53 and the average family size was 3.13.

In the city, the population was spread out, with 29.6% under the age of 18, 8.0% from 18 to 24, 24.9% from 25 to 44, 20.9% from 45 to 64, and 16.6% who were 65 years of age or older. The median age was 35 years. For every 100 females, there were 79.1 males. For every 100 females age 18 and over, there were 72.7 males.

The median income for a household in the city was $22,105, and the median income for a family was $27,188. Males had a median income of $30,000 versus $20,603 for females. The per capita income for the city was $13,522. 35.0% of the population and 28.9% of families were below the poverty line. Out of the total population, 47.9% of those under the age of 18 and 25.5% of those 65 and older were living below the poverty line.

Education

Taylor County School District 
The Taylor County School District holds pre-school to grade twelve, and consists of two elementary schools, a middle school, and a high school. The district has 101 full-time teachers and over 1,735 students.
Taylor County Primary School
Taylor County Upper Elementary
Taylor County Middle School
Taylor County High School

The Taylor County Girls' basketball team (1967 - 1972) holds the record for the nation's longest girl's high school basketball winning streak by winning 132 consecutive games, going undefeated for five years and winning five back-to-back state championships.

History 
The Central of Georgia Railway was built through the present area of Butler about 1850. The line is currently owned by Norfolk Southern and hosts three to four trains per day.

Butler was incorporated on February 8, 1854, but the charter was not received until 1870. Taylor County was carved from the Creek Indian territory which had in earlier years become the counties of Marion, Talbot, and Macon.

The chosen location of Butler was known as the "Fifty Mile Station" on the railroad because it was the geographical center of the railroad between Macon and Columbus, Georgia.

The city of Butler, Georgia, was named for General William Orlando Butler, a distinguished soldier of the Mexican–American War and a candidate for Vice President on the ticket with General Lewis Cass of Michigan.

In late 2016, a 1070 acre 103 megawatt solar panel facility was completed. The Butler Solar Facility is owned by First Solar.

Notable people
 Ella Little-Collins, civil rights activist

Gallery

References

Cities in Georgia (U.S. state)
Cities in Taylor County, Georgia
County seats in Georgia (U.S. state)